Siege of Esztergom may refer to
Siege of Esztergom (1241)
Siege of Esztergom (1543)
Siege of Esztergom (1596)